William James was a professional rugby league footballer who played in the 1920s and 1930s. He played at club level for Oldham RLFC (Heritage No. 265) and Castleford (Heritage No. 78).

Playing career
William James played in Castleford's victory in the Yorkshire County League during the 1932–33 season.

In September 1935, Castleford reduced their asking fee for the transfer of James from £150 to £50.

References

External links
Search for "James" at rugbyleagueproject.org
Billy James Memory Box Search at archive.castigersheritage.com

Castleford Tigers players
English rugby league players
Oldham R.L.F.C. players
Place of birth missing
Place of death missing
Year of birth missing
Year of death missing